Gordon Lee Dillard (born May 20, 1964) is an American former professional baseball pitcher. He played in Major League Baseball (MLB) for the Baltimore Orioles (1988) and Philadelphia Phillies (1989). His 1988 season was split between the Charlotte Knights (7–5, 2.19 ERA), Rochester Red Wings (0–2, 2.45 ERA) and two appearances without a decision with the Orioles. He was traded along with Ken Howell from the Orioles to the Phillies for Phil Bradley on December 9, 1988.

References

External links

Major League Baseball pitchers
Baltimore Orioles players
Philadelphia Phillies players
Newark Orioles players
Hagerstown Suns players
Charlotte Knights players
Charlotte O's players
Rochester Red Wings players
Connors State Cowboys baseball players
Scranton/Wilkes-Barre Red Barons players
Buffalo Bisons (minor league) players
Salinas Spurs players
Baseball players from California
1964 births
Living people
Oklahoma State Cowboys baseball players